South Carolina Highway 211 may refer to:

South Carolina Highway 211, a state highway from northeast of Pacolet to Sharon
South Carolina Highway 211 (1925–1928), a former state highway from Travelers Rest to near Cleveland
South Carolina Highway 211 (1932–1942), a former state highway from Fort Mill to near Indian Land

211 (disambiguation)